Clam Falls is an unincorporated community located in the town of Clam Falls, Polk County, Wisconsin, United States.

References

Unincorporated communities in Polk County, Wisconsin
Unincorporated communities in Wisconsin